Sagteng Gewog, also called Sakteng is a gewog (village block) of Trashigang District, Bhutan. Sakten and Merak Gewogs comprise Sakten Dungkhag (sub-district). Much of the gewog lies within the Sakteng Wildlife Sanctuary.

References

Gewogs of Bhutan
Trashigang District